Patricio G. Espinoza, (born in Quito, Ecuador), is a journalist best known for his Spanish-language investigative TV news reports, newspaper columns and Hispanic community contributions in the United States.  Espinoza is an active freelance contributor to major national networks including ABC, NBC, CBS, Univision, Telemundo, NPR Radio Bilingue, A&E, Discovery, and Court-TV.  In 2004, Espinoza received the Emmy Award for his work on a program called "En Su Defensa" ("In your defense") in the Specialty Assignment Reporter category.  Also in 2004, the news story 'Election Immigrant Workers/Mayoral Candidate', which was produced by Espinoza, won an Emmy in the Specialty Assignment Report category.  In 2005, the piece "Trágica Jornada" ("Tragic Journey"), produced by Espinoza, won an Emmy in the Continuing Coverage category.  Espinoza runs the not-for-profit community journalism website AlamoCityTimes.com and espiBlog.org.  Today Espinoza continuous his journalism work in the public interest at the forefront of New Media and Digital convergence most recently leading Digital Journalism Projects including SA4Mayor.com covering the 2009 candidates for mayor in San Antonio, Texas. Patricio Espinoza is a Knight Digital Center Fellow at U.C, Berkeley and USC, a Poynter and McCormick Fellow. Since 2003 Patricio Espinoza has received 5 Lonestar Emmy awards.

See also
KXLN-TV

References

External links
Awards
My Reporters Notepad
espiBlog.org
 CNN i-Report
Knight Fellow

1962 births
Living people
American male journalists
20th-century American journalists
Ecuadorian emigrants to the United States